Chintada is a village located in Bobbili mandal of the Vizianagaram district (Earlier in Srikakulam district), Andhra Pradesh State in India.

Demographics
 Indian census, the demographic details of Chintada village is as follows:
 Total Population: 	5,044 in 1,229 Households
 Male Population: 	2,561 and Female Population: 	2,483
 Children Under 6-years of age: 	582 (Boys -	298 and Girls -	284)
 Total Literates: 	2,456

Education
There is a Zilla Parishad High School in the village.

See also 
Bobbili mandal

References

Villages in Vizianagaram district